Shirlene King Pearson (born January 5, 1972), known as Ms. Juicy Baby, Ms. Juicy, or simply Juicy, is an American reality television personality, radio personality, actress, executive producer,  and talent manager, born in Corsicana, Texas, and raised in Atlanta, Georgia. She is known for her self-proclaimed titles, "The Queen of Atlanta" or “The Queen of the A.T.L.” 

She is a cast member and executive producer on the Lifetime reality television show Little Women: Atlanta. Pearson has stated she hopes Little Women: Atlanta "teaches and informs people about who little people are."

Several images and GIFs of Pearson have become popular memes on sites such as Twitter and Tumblr.

References

Living people
Actors with dwarfism
Participants in American reality television series
Place of birth missing (living people)
American women television personalities
1972 births